The 1965 Cork Senior Football Championship was the 77th staging of the Cork Senior Football Championship since its establishment by the Cork County Board in 1887. The draw for the opening round fixtures took place on 31 January 1965. The championship began on 11 April 1965 and ended on 14 November 1965.

University College Cork entered the championship as the defending champions, however, they were beaten by St. Nicholas' in the semi-final.

On 14 November 1965, St. Nicholas' won the championship following a 2-04 to 0-06 defeat of St. Finbarr's in the final. This was their fourth championship title and their first title since 1954.

University College Cork's Dan Harnedy was the championship's top scorer with 0-17.

Results

First round

Quarter-finals

Semi-finals

Final

Championship statistics

Top scorers

Overall

In a single game

References

Cork Senior Football Championship